David Cohn, better known by his stage name Serengeti, is an American rapper from Chicago, Illinois.

Early life
Serengeti is the great-nephew of jazz trumpeter Sonny Cohn. He grew up in various places in Chicago, Illinois, as his parents divorced when he was 5 years old. At the age of 12, he got into hip hop. He started writing verses while attending Morgan Park High School. He attended Southern Illinois University Carbondale, where he became friends with Open Mike Eagle. He graduated from the university in 2001 with a degree in history.

Career
In 2007, Serengeti released the first collaborative album with producer Polyphonic, titled Don't Give Up. The duo released their second collaborative album, Terradactyl, in 2009.

In 2011, Serengeti released his solo album, Family & Friends, which was produced by Yoni Wolf and Owen Ashworth.

Serengeti is a member of Sisyphus along with Son Lux and Sufjan Stevens. The trio released Beak & Claw in 2012 and a self-titled album in 2014.

In 2012, Serengeti released C.A.R., as well as  Kenny Dennis EP. Kenny Dennis EP was Serengeti's first release chronicling the biography of his meta character "Kenny Dennis", a once-famous Gangsta rap artist navigating life after the peak of stardom. The EP was later ranked among the top 40 Hip Hop releases of 2012 by SPIN Magazine. He followed this up with Kenny Dennis LP in 2013 and Kenny Dennis III in 2014.

2020 saw the well-received release of Ajai with collaborator Kenny Segal, a continuation of the Kenny Dennis canon. Cohn raps about the life of Ajai, a new character obsessed with Designer clothing and sneaker drops, who interacts with Dennis within the drop-collecting community.

Style
Serengeti's music is a sharp departure from most mainstream hip hop, which he considers "depressing" and always consists of "the same redundant ideas."

In an interview, Serengeti said he created Dennehy as an "answer to common complaints about hip-hop" and "to put the fun back in hip-hop."

Discography

Studio albums
 Dirty Flamingo (F5 Records, 2003)
 Noodle-Arm Whimsy (The Frozen Food Section, 2005)
 Gasoline Rainbows (Day by Day Entertainment, 2006)
 Thunder Valley (Audio 8 Recordings, 2006)
 Race Trading (Audio 8 Recordings, 2006)
 Noticeably Negro (Audio 8 Recordings, 2006)
 Dennehy (Bonafyde Recordings, 2006)
 Don't Give Up (Audio 8 Recordings, 2007) 
 The Boredom of Me (Audio 8 Recordings, 2008) 
 Friday Night (Breakfast Records, 2008) 
 Terradactyl (Anticon, 2009) 
 Conversations with Kenny / Legacy of Lee (Golden Floyd Records, 2009)
 There's a Situation on the Homefront (Breakfast Records, 2010) 
 Saturday Night (Breakfast Records, 2010) 
 Shtaad (Blank Records, 2011) 
 Family & Friends (Anticon, 2011)
 C.A.R. (Anticon, 2012)
 Saal (Graveface Records, 2013)
 Kenny Dennis LP (Anticon, 2013)
 Sisyphus (Asthmatic Kitty/Joyful Noise, 2014) 
 Kenny Dennis III (Joyful Noise, 2014)
 Time and Materials (Mello Music Group, 2015) 
 Testarossa (Joyful Noise, 2016) 
 Doctor My Own Patience (Graveface Records, 2016) 
 Kaleidoscope (Audio Recon, 2017)
 Dennehy (Fake Four Inc., 2017) 
 Jueles - Butterflies (self-released, 2017)
 To the Max (self-released, 2018)
 Dennis 6e (self-released, 2018)
 Music from the Graphic Novel: Kenny vs the Dark Web (Burnco Recs, 2019)
 EUD (Geti Enterprises, 2019)
 Ajai (Cohn Corporation/Fake Four Inc., 2020) 
 The Gentle Fall (Cohn Corporation, 2020)
With Greg From Deerhoof (Joyful Noise Recordings, 2020) 
Kdxmpc (Cohn Corporation, 2020)
Ajai II (self-released, 2022)

Remix albums
 Friday Night Remixed (Breakfast Records, 2010)

EPs
 Bells and a Floating World (Anticon, 2010) 
 There's a Situation on the Homefront EP (Chopped Herring Records, 2011) 
 Davis (Leaving Records, 2011) 
 Beak & Claw (Anticon, 2012) 
 Kenny Dennis EP (Anticon, 2012)
 C.A.B. (Anticon, 2013)
 You Can't Run from the Rhythm (Joyful Noise, 2015) 
 Dust (F5 Records, 2016)
 Kaleidoscope EP (Joyful Noise, 2017)
 Derek (Fake Four Inc./Audio Recon, 2017)
 Kaleidoscope 2 (self-released, 2018)
 The Moon (self-released, 2018)
 6e Features from Berlin (self-released, 2019)
 Quail (Audio Recon, 2019)
 Energy (Geti Enterprises, 2019)
 Quarantine Recordings (Auto Reverse Records, 2020)

Singles
 "Black Giraffes / Busty Women" (F5 Records, 2003)
 "Fast Living / Breakfast of Champions" (The Frozen Food Section, 2005)
 "Be a Man" (Graveface Records, 2012) 
 "Firebird Logo" (Burnco Recs, 2013)
 "Havin' a Time" (Geti Enterprises, 2019)
 "Ajai Epilogue" (Cohn Corporation/Fake Four Inc., 2020) 
"Première" (Joyful Noise Recordings, 2020)
 "Unblu" (Loves Way, 2020)

Guest appearances
 Themselves - "Keys to Ignition" from The Free Houdini (2009)
 Tobacco - "2 Thick Scoops" from LA UTI (2010)
 Open Mike Eagle - "Easter Surgery" from Unapologetic Art Rap (2010)
 Open Mike Eagle - "Four Days" from Extended Nightmares Getdown: The Dark Blue Door (2011)
 Open Mike Eagle - "Universe Man" from 4nml Hsptl (2012)
 Open Mike Eagle - "Credits Interlude" from Component System with the Auto Reverse (2022)

Compilation appearances
 "Blood Pt. 2" on Dark Was the Night (2009)

References

External links
 
 
 

Living people
Year of birth missing (living people)
Rappers from Chicago
African-American rappers
Anticon artists
Sisyphus (hip hop group) members
21st-century American rappers
Joyful Noise Recordings artists
21st-century African-American musicians
Southern Illinois University Carbondale alumni
Underground rappers